Konevo is a village in the municipality of Varbitsa, Shumen Province, Bulgaria. As of 2007, the village has a population of 261 people.

References

Villages in Shumen Province